Mariano Barreto (born 18 January 1957) is a Portuguese football manager.

Coaching career
In January 2009, he became an assistant coach in the Russian Premier League with FC Kuban Krasnodar. Barreto was officially registered as head coach of Kuban because Sergei Ovchinnikov, who really managed the team, did not own a UEFA Pro Licence.

In April 2014, Barreto was selected to take over the head coach of Ethiopia. He agreed to leave the position on 18 April 2015.

From 2016 manager in FC Stumbras. In 2017 won Lithuanian Football Cup.

Honours
FC Stumbras

 Lithuanian Football Cup: 2017

Individual
 A Lyga Coach of the Month: June & July 2018

References

Portuguese football managers
Portuguese expatriate football managers
Portuguese expatriate sportspeople in Lithuania
Ghana national football team managers
Ethiopia national football team managers
C.S. Marítimo managers
AEL Limassol managers
Associação Naval 1º de Maio managers
FC Stumbras managers
Expatriate football managers in Ghana
Expatriate football managers in the United Arab Emirates
Expatriate football managers in Cyprus
Expatriate football managers in Saudi Arabia
Expatriate football managers in Ethiopia
Expatriate football managers in Lithuania
Indian people of Portuguese descent
Portuguese people of Goan descent
1957 births
Living people
Ghana Premier League managers
Burgan SC managers
Expatriate football managers in Kuwait
Portuguese expatriate sportspeople in Kuwait
Portuguese expatriate sportspeople in Ethiopia
Portuguese expatriate sportspeople in Cyprus
Portuguese expatriate sportspeople in Ghana
Portuguese expatriate sportspeople in the United Arab Emirates
Portuguese expatriate sportspeople in Saudi Arabia
Al Nassr FC managers